WUPX-TV (channel 67) is a television station licensed to Richmond, Kentucky, United States, serving the Lexington area as an affiliate of Ion Television. The station is owned by Inyo Broadcast Holdings, and maintains a transmitter on High Bridge Road north of Bryantsville, Kentucky.

History
A construction permit for WAOM was issued on October 14, 1985. Originally licensed to Morehead, Kentucky, the station signed on the air on June 1, 1998, with low-powered UPN affiliate WBLU-LP (channel 62) signing on a year later. Both stations simulcast programming from UPN and The WB as well as infomercials until WAOM was sold off in 2001. After WAOM was sold, WBLU-LP lost both The WB and UPN in 2003 and 2004, respectively, to become independent, and at some point became affiliated with MyNetworkTV and RTV. WBLU-LP is no longer broadcasting as it went dark in 2009 after its parent company went bankrupt.

In 2001, WAOM-TV was sold to Paxson Communications (now Ion Media), became a Pax TV owned-and-operated station and changed its callsign to the current WUPX-TV. Pax TV became i: Independent Television in 2005, and then Ion Television in 2007.

On December 11, 2018, the FCC granted WUPX-TV's petition to change its city of license from Morehead to Richmond, Kentucky. The move was conditioned upon the station providing continued service to Morehead.

Near sale to Scripps; sale to Inyo Broadcast Holdings
On September 24, 2020, the Cincinnati-based E. W. Scripps Company announced that it would purchase Ion Media for $2.65 billion, with financing from Berkshire Hathaway. With this purchase, Scripps will divest 23 Ion-owned stations, but no announcement was made as to which stations that Scripps would divest as part of the move. However, on October 16, 2020, it was announced that WUPX-TV would be one of the stations that Scripps would spin off as part of the merger. The buyer, revealed in an October 2020 FCC filing to be Inyo Broadcast Holdings, has promised to maintain the stations' Ion Television affiliations after the purchase. The proposed divestitures will allow the merged company to fully comply with the FCC local and national ownership regulations. This would have made it a sister station to NBC affiliate WLEX-TV (channel 18) if Scripps had decided to keep WUPX-TV, but Lexington has fewer than eight independently owned and operating full-power television stations, not enough to permit a duopoly in any case. The transaction was finalized and closed on January 7, 2021.

Technical information

Subchannels
The station's digital signal is multiplexed:

Analog-to-digital conversion
WUPX-TV shut down its analog signal, over UHF channel 67, on June 12, 2009, the official date in which full-power television stations in the United States transitioned from analog to digital broadcasts under federal mandate. The station's digital signal remained on its pre-transition UHF channel 21. Through the use of PSIP, digital television receivers display the station's virtual channel as its former UHF analog channel 67, which was among the high band UHF channels (52–69) that were removed from broadcasting use as a result of the transition.

TV spectrum repack
WUPX moved its channel allocation from digital channel 21 to channel 25 in 2019, but it remained on virtual channel 67. The station relocated its transmitter to a tower southwest of Lexington formerly used by Fox affiliate WDKY-TV (channel 56).

References

External links

UPX-TV
Ion Television affiliates
Grit (TV network) affiliates
Ion Mystery affiliates
Scripps News affiliates
Laff (TV network) affiliates
Defy TV affiliates
TrueReal affiliates
Television channels and stations established in 1998
1998 establishments in Kentucky
Richmond, Kentucky